Chen Poxi (14th-century) was a Chinese tanchang-singer and musician.  

She was famous in contemporary China for her ability to perform in all the languages of the Chinese minorities during her tours, while accompanying herself by playing music instruments, and was praised by critics for having a "Golden" voice which "reigned over the clouds."  She was described as intelligent, wise and entertaining and enjoyed great popularity.

References 
 Lily Xiao Hong Lee, Sue Wiles: Biographical Dictionary of Chinese Women, Volume II: Tang Through Ming 618 - 1644

14th-century Chinese people
14th-century Chinese women
14th-century Chinese women singers